Sharon Weston Broome (born October 1, 1956) is the mayor-president of Baton Rouge, Louisiana. She served in the Louisiana State Senate representing the 15th district from 2005 to 2016. She was elected mayor-president in a runoff election held on December 10, 2016. Broome is the first African-American woman to serve as mayor-president.

From 2008 to 2016, Broome was the President Pro Tempore of the state Senate. In 2011, she was elected to her second full Senate term without opposition.

Early life and career
From 1992 to 2004, Broome was a member of the Louisiana House of Representatives for District 29. She was succeeded by her legislative assistant, Regina Barrow. From 1996 to 2003, she was Chairman of Municipal, Parochial and Cultural Affairs Committee. Broome was elected Speaker Pro Tempore of the House, the first woman to have held that position. Broome is hence the first woman to serve in the number-two leadership position in both legislative chambers.

In 2002, Broome introduced House Concurrent Resolution (HCR) 74 which condemned "Darwinism" as justifying racism and Nazism. The bill was amended to remove allusions to Darwin and passed. In 2012, she sponsored a bill requiring doctors to let a woman hear the heartbeat of a fetus (if present) before performing an abortion. The bill was signed into law by Republican Louisiana Governor Bobby Jindal on June 8, 2012.

Before being elected to state office, Broome, a native of Chicago, Illinois, served on the Baton Rouge Metro Council. She holds two degrees in communications and worked as a reporter for WBRZ-TV for five years.

Broome was among the state and local officials who endorsed the unsuccessful reelection in 2014 of Democrat U.S. Senator Mary Landrieu.

Mayor of Baton Rouge

2016 election

Term-limited in the Senate, Broome was the first candidate to declare her intentions to run in 2016 to succeed Kip Holden as Mayor-President for East Baton Rouge Parish. Several Republican candidates also ran; the Republican state Senator Bodi White in turn lost to Broome the runoff election held on December 10, 2016. White received 55,241 votes (48 percent) to Broome's 59,737 (52 percent).

Broome was sworn into office on January 2, 2017.

First Term
As Mayor-President, Broome in April 2017 appointed Troy Bell as the city-parish Chief administrative officer (CAO), but he resigned after less than a week in the $144,000 annual post after it was disclosed that he does not hold the master's degree in public administration that he had claimed in his resume. Broome tapped James Llorens of Baton Rouge as the interim CAO. Several human resources professionals claim that the Bell selection could have been avoided had Broome followed a different approach to vetting candidates for appointments. Broome announced thereafter that she will spearhead the search for her next CAO selection to prevent problems like those that surfaced in the Bell case.

In July 2017, calls were made for the Louisiana Legislative Auditor and the State Inspector General to investigate the Baton Rouge Area Violence Elimination Program (BRAVE) contracts being issued by the office of Mayor-President Sharon Weston-Broome. The questionable contracts first came to light as a result of public records requests by the 9NEWS Investigative Team. In August 2017, Broome suspended all BRAVE contracts issued from mid-June to mid-July.

In August 2017, Baton Rouge District Attorney Hillar Moore announced that he was seeking a list of confidential informant names that were erroneously released by Mayor-President Broom's office.

In August 2018, Broome proposed a half-cent sales tax, rather than a property tax, to fund the proposed MoveBR roads program under consideration by the Metro Council. If approved by the council, the measure would then be placed on the December 8 ballot. Broome said that the sales tax is preferred so as not to place the entire burden on property owners. Many residents, she said, encouraged her to pursue the sales tax as "more equitable" than a property tax though sales taxes are regressive in nature. Voters approved the half-cent sales tax on December 8, 2018, in what is viewed as a big victory for the mayor-president that demonstrates her being able to garner bipartisan support from the business community.

2020 election 

On November 3, 2020, it was determined that Broome would do another runoff, this time with former state senator Steve Carter, after receiving 48% percent of the vote in the general mayor election. In a runoff which was held December 5, 2020, Broome would win a second term with 65,495 (57 percent) of the vote in another runoff.

Second Term
Broome championed a 2021 proposal for Housing for Heroes, a "36-unit affordable housing development for first responders" in the Scotlandville area of Baton Rouge. As of 2023, funding for the project had not been transferred from the federal government.

Broome's tenure has been marred by rising crime and scandals within the Baton Rouge Police Department.

Personal life
She is married to Marvin Alonzo Broome and they have three children.

References

External links
Official website

|-

|-

|-

|-

1956 births
20th-century American women politicians
20th-century American politicians
21st-century American women politicians
21st-century American politicians
African-American journalists
African-American mayors in Louisiana
African-American state legislators in Louisiana
African-American Christians
Baptists from Louisiana
Living people
Democratic Party Louisiana state senators
Mayors of Baton Rouge, Louisiana
Democratic Party members of the Louisiana House of Representatives
Politicians from Chicago
Politicians from La Crosse, Wisconsin
Politicians from Baton Rouge, Louisiana
Regent University alumni
University of Wisconsin–La Crosse alumni
Women mayors of places in Louisiana
Women state legislators in Louisiana
20th-century African-American women
20th-century African-American politicians
21st-century African-American women
African-American women mayors